Jade Soune-Seyne is a Réunionese beauty pageant titleholder who was crowned as Miss Earth Reunion 2015 and Reunion Island's representative in Miss Earth 2015. She was crowned by Miss Earth 2014 Jamie Herrell.

References

Miss Earth 2015 contestants
Living people
Year of birth missing (living people)